Murray Heatley (born November 7, 1948) is a Canadian former ice hockey player. 

Heatley played professional hockey for the Minnesota Fighting Saints and the Indianapolis Racers in the World Hockey Association. He also played seven seasons in Germany, playing for SC Riessersee and ERC Freiburg.

Career statistics

Personal life
Heatley is the father of Dany Heatley who played thirteen seasons in the National Hockey League for five different teams and a three-time NHL All-Star. Another son, Mark Heatley (born 1984), is also a professional ice hockey player who played extensively in Germany.

Awards and honors

References

External links

1948 births
Living people
Canadian ice hockey right wingers
Ice hockey people from Calgary
Indianapolis Racers players
Minnesota Fighting Saints players
Mohawk Valley Comets players
EHC Olten players
Phoenix Roadrunners (WHL) players
SC Riessersee players
Tulsa Oilers (1964–1984) players
Wisconsin Badgers men's ice hockey players
Canadian expatriate ice hockey players in the United States